Chaynesse Khirouni (born 17 March 1968 in Douai) is a French politician elected in 2012 as a deputy for the Socialist Party.

She is the daughter of a steel industry Algerian toiler.

She finished first in the first round in Meurthe-et-Moselle's 1st constituency, with 37.9% and won the second round with 52.23%.

She also sits on the municipal council of Nancy.

Notes and references

1968 births
Living people
People from Douai
French people of Algerian descent
Socialist Party (France) politicians
French city councillors
Women members of the National Assembly (France)
Deputies of the 14th National Assembly of the French Fifth Republic
21st-century French women politicians